Elwyn James Anthony (21 January 1916 – 10 December 2014) was a British psychoanalyst and was best known for his work on resilience and invulnerability/risk in children, particularly those whose parents had serious mental illnesses. He was one of two founders, along with S. H. Foulkes, of the field of group psychotherapy. A prolific writer, he authored 320 research articles and 18 books, many of which were translated into other languages. James Anthony was a training psychoanalyst who studied in London where he began a distinguished career as a child psychotherapist and psychiatrist. He studied child development under Jean Piaget and, after leaving the Maudsley Hospital, occupied the Ittleson Chair of Child Psychiatry, at Washington University School of Medicine, St. Louis. He later became Director of Psychotherapy at Chestnut Lodge, where he developed a program of group psychotherapy for adolescent inpatients.

He was President of the American Academy of Child and Adolescent Psychiatry (AACAP), President of the International Association of Child and Adolescent Psychiatry and Allied Professions, the Association for Child Analysis, and the World Association of Infant Psychiatry.

Anthony was recruited from England in 1958 to hold the world’s first endowed chair in Child Psychiatry, the Blanche F. Ittleson Professorship at Washington University in St. Louis where most of his longitudinal research was conducted. His work in St. Louis at the Edison Child Study Center included many grants from foundations and the NIMH. His collaboration with Foulkes, who became his training analyst, began at Northfield Hospital and in the 1950s he became a founder member of the Group Analytic Society.

Anthony was born in Calcutta, India and educated in Darjeeling, India from the age of four and a half by Jesuits before immigrating to England for medical training. He was a protégé and collaborator with Jean Piaget, Anna Freud, Erik Erikson, John Bowlby and Sir Aubrey Lewis who throughout his early career introduced him to international and cultural aspects of child development.

He attended medical school at Kings College during the Second World War, including delivering babies during the bombings of London. His first assignment as an officer was to work at Northfield Military Center with S.H. Foulkes, dealing with "shell shocked soldiers". There they started rudimentary group psychotherapy. Later he was transferred to Hong Kong as chief medical officer for Southeast Asia and was charged with setting up day care centers for Japanese children who survived the Hiroshima bombings. When he returned from the war, he continued his psychiatric and child psychiatric training at the Maudsley Hospital and received the gold medal from the University of London. He was a member of the Royal College of Psychiatry and his numerous lectureships included a standing appointment at the London School of Economics.

He was a senior lecturer at the Hampstead Clinic and received a Nuffield Fellowship to study with Jean Piaget. At the same time his collaboration with S.H. Foulkes on Groups led them to co-author "Group Psychotherapy: the Psychoanalytic Approach" considered to this day as the bible of group psychotherapy with many reprintings.

During his presidency of the International Association of Child and Adolescent Psychiatry and Allied Professions he formed study groups of colleagues from around the world to learn from various cultures about child development and childhood disorders. He initiated this work, led it, and arranged for funding. This effort was the basis of several of his books. As a testament to his lasting legacy and expertise, this spring, two books on the subject contain introductions by Anthony.

As AACAP President, he continued his commitment on international collaboration, with both a joint meeting in Mexico, and in leading two large groups to China on the brink of its opening to the West. He collaborated with future AACAP Presidents and co-led other trips including to the USSR. As a result of this trip, for the first time ever, the USSR sent 8 of its researchers to participate in the AACAP’s annual meeting.

Anthony also formed a study group to mentor, nurture, and support young researchers in the beginning of their careers. He was also responsible for the first, of what would later be known as the Presidential Interview at the AACAP Annual Meeting when he interviewed Joan and Erik Erikson. His appointment to the Work Group on Consumer Issues led to the development of AACAP’s Facts for Families, which have been translated into multiple languages. Also during Anthony’s AACAP Presidency, a successful offer was made to purchase our (AACAP’s) current headquarters.

He maintained a private practice until the age of 90. He was a member of the British, St. Louis, Chicago, and Washington DC Psychoanalytic Societies.

He was married to Ethel Frances until her death in 1983. They have four children, eleven grandchildren and ten great grandchildren. He was married for 30 years to Virginia Quinn Anthony, former executive director of AACAP. Anthony died on December 10, 2014.

References

Anthony, E. J. (1975) "There and then and here and now" in: International Journal of Group Psychotherapy; 25, pp. 163–167
Reference to the "late E. James Anthony"

External links

 Flapan, Dorothy. "The ongoing journey of an extraordinary man in the field of group psychotherapy: an interview"

1916 births
2014 deaths
British child psychiatrists
Group psychotherapists
British psychoanalysts
Washington University in St. Louis faculty